Francis Jerome Helluin (August 8, 1929 - October 18, 2017) was a professional American football player who played defensive tackle for seven seasons for the Cleveland Browns, the Green Bay Packers, and the Houston Oilers. He died on October 18, 2017, at the age of 88.

References

1929 births
2017 deaths
Sportspeople from Houma, Louisiana
Players of American football from Louisiana
Tulane Green Wave football players
American football defensive tackles
Cleveland Browns players
Green Bay Packers players
Houston Oilers players
American Football League players